FC Mglebi Zugdidi is a Georgian football club based in Zugdidi. They play in the Umaglesi Liga, the top division in Georgian football.

In July 2006, FC Mglebi Zugdidi and FC Zugdidi merged.

Seasons
{|class="wikitable"
|-bgcolor="#efefef"
! Season
! League
! Pos.
! Pl.
! W
! D
! L
! GF
! GA
! P
! Cup
! Notes
! Manager
|-
|2005–06
|bgcolor=#98bb98|Regionuli Liga West
|align=right|
|align=right| ||align=right| ||align=right| ||align=right| 
|align=right| ||align=right| ||align=right| 
|
|
|
|-
|}

See also
FC Dinamo Zugdidi
FC Zugdidi

Mglebi Zugdidi
2006 establishments in Georgia (country)
Association football clubs established in 2006